is a Japanese music television channel operated by Space Shower Networks, Inc. The company is headquartered in Minato, Tokyo. The channel launched at 6:00 on December 1, 1989.

The idea behind establishing Space Shower TV was to create a specialized music channel like MTV in Japan. The purpose was to make it a strictly music channel providing quality content that would meet the standards of a true music fan.

See also 
 Space Shower Music Video Awards
 Space Shower Music

References

External links 
 

Mass media companies based in Tokyo
Music television channels
Television channels and stations established in 1989
1989 establishments in Japan
Japanese-language television stations
Itochu
Music organizations based in Japan